Phillip Arthur Charles Lawrence Oppenheim (born 20 March 1956) is a British businessman and former politician.

Early life
Oppenheim was born in Lambeth in South London, in 1956. He is the son of former Conservative government minister Sally Oppenheim.

Education
Oppenheim was educated at Harrow School, in north-west London, and Oriel College, Oxford.

Political career
Oppenheim was unexpectedly elected with the largest swing in the 1983 election as the Conservative Member of Parliament for the one time safe-Labour coal mining seat of Amber Valley. In the 1987 election he increased his vote share by over 10% in what was picked out by the election analysts David Butler and Robert Waller as being among a few "exceptional results" seen in "individual constituencies" in that election. He represented it until electoral defeat in the 1997 general election to Labour's Judy Mallaber.
 
During his time in Parliament, Oppenheim served in various ministerial posts in the governments of Margaret Thatcher and John Major and was also the parliamentary aide to Kenneth Clarke, the former Chancellor. While in parliament, he was known for strong free-market and free trade as well as socially liberal views, including supporting animal welfare issues and opposing the sport of fox hunting. As a Treasury minister, he toughened restrictions on imports of endangered species and introduced tax breaks on less-polluting fuels, including LPG. As a trade minister, he resisted efforts by the fur lobby to loosen restrictions on imports of trapped fur. He was also in favour of an elected House of Lords. An expert on trade policy, Oppenheim wrote two award-winning books (The New Masters in 1990 and Trade Wars in 1992) attacking US and European protectionism against both Japan and Third World countries. He has blamed this policy for contributing to poverty in the developing world.

Along with Humfrey Malins, Oppenheim established the Commons and Lords Rugby Club, which played its first match in 1991.

Life and business career
Before entering Parliament, Oppenheim was a businessman, founding an information technology company which was sold to Reed Elsevier.

After leaving Parliament in 1997, Oppenheim became a columnist for The Sunday Times and other newspapers. He has criticised new Labour's spin culture, along with what he saw as the corrupt sale of peerages, and the Conservative Party for its rightward drift.
    
Oppenheim is founder and managing director of the Cubana bar and restaurant in London and is credited for introducing Mojitos to the UK from Cuba in the 1990s.

He is also a founder director of Waterloo Quarter, a business-public alliance which aims to improve Waterloo. He trades directly with Cuba, importing rum and coffee and is also a director of Alma de Cuba coffee, a Cuban coffee brand owned by The Cuba Mountain Coffee Company, which has a project to help mountain coffee farmers in Cuba.

Notes

External links

1956 births
Living people
People educated at Harrow School
Alumni of Oriel College, Oxford
Conservative Party (UK) MPs for English constituencies
English Jews
Members of the Parliament of the United Kingdom for constituencies in Derbyshire
UK MPs 1983–1987
UK MPs 1987–1992
UK MPs 1992–1997
Jewish British politicians
Sons of life peers